Sandro Damilano (born 24 February 1950, in Scarnafigi) is an Italian athletics coach.

He is the brother of the Italian twin race walker, Maurizio and Giorgio, which began to coached in the mid-1970s.

Biography
He was the coach of the Italy national athletics team until 2011, he coached Italian champion Elisabetta Perrone, Erica Alfridi and after also Alex Schwazer. In 2012 he is the coach of the Chinese national of race walking.

He is one of the coaches of the Saluzzo Race Walking School, created by the town of Saluzzo in 2002, the school is also the center for the diffusion of fitwalking and training center of international race walking.

See also
Maurizio Damilano
Giorgio Damilano
Power walking
Saluzzo Race Walking School

References

External links
 Development - ATC Saluzzo (ITA) at IAAF web site
 

Italian athletics coaches
1950 births
Living people
Sportspeople from the Province of Cuneo